Ghulam Mustafa Khan, SI (23 September 1912 – 25 September 2005) was a Pakistani researcher, literary critic, linguist, author, scholar of Urdu literature and linguistics, educationist and religious and spiritual leader belonging to Naqshbandi order of Sufism.

Life and services
He was born in Jabalpur, India on 23 September 1912, in a Urdu-speaking Pashtun family. In 1928 he finished his ninth grade from Anjuman Islamia High School, Jabalpur and went to Aligarh Muslim University, Aligarh for the rest of his education. He received his higher education at the Aligarh Muslim University. He held LLB and M.A. in Urdu literature & Persian and completed his PhD on 12th-century Persian poet Syed Ashruddin Hassan Ghaznavi in 1947. In 1959, he was awarded D.Litt. by Nagpur University, India.

During his life he was appointed as a lecturer at the King Edward College, Amrawati and after migration to Pakistan from India he was appointed in Urdu College, Karachi. Later in his life, he also performed the duties of head of the department of Urdu in Sindh University. For his academic services he was honoured with various level of awards, including the Naqoosh award, Iqbal award and Nishan-i-Sipas.

He published a number of research papers and a quantity of books, translations and compilations, numbering about ninety three. His book on Iqbal and Quran was awarded as the best book ever written on this subject and was awarded the Gold Medal Award by Idara-e-Adbiat, Pakistan (Institute of Literature, Pakistan).

Ghulam Mustafa was a renowned religious and spiritual leader. His students included famous scholars such as Ibn-e-Insha, Jameel Jalibi, Abul Lais Siddiqui, Aslam Farrukhi, Farman Fatehpuri, Moinuddin Aqeel, and Abul Khair Kashfi.

Books
He was author of more than 100 books in Arabic, Persian, Urdu and English. Some of his notable publications include:
Iqbāl aur Qurʼān. An analysis of the Urdu and Persian poetical works of Sir Muhammad Iqbal, 1877-1938, with particular reference to his inspiration from the Koran
Maulānā ʻUbaidullāh Sindhī kī sarguz̲asht-i Kābul. On the life and political activities of Indian Muslim reformer 'Ubayd Allāh Sindī, 1872-1944, against the British while in exile in Afghanistan, 1915-1922
Urdū men̲ Qurʼān aur Ḥadīs ke muḥāvarāt. On the influence of the Koran and Hadith on Urdu phraseology, includes specimens from the works of noted Urdu poets
Adabī jāʼize. Series of books reviews on Urdu literature
Fihrist : Sindh men̲ Urdū mak̲h̲t̤ūt̤āt. List of Urdu manuscripts, found in different libraries or with individuals in Sindh, Pakistan
Sayyid Ḥasan G̲h̲aznavī : ḥayāt aur adabī kārnāme, Fārsī ke buzurg shāʻir Sayyid Ḥ̦asan G̲h̲aznavī. On the life and works of Ḥasan Ghaznavi, 12th century Persian poet; includes samples from his works; scholarly study
S̲aqafatī Urdū. On the words and phrases assimilated in Urdu from various Indic languages.
Fārsī par Urdū kā as̲ar. On the influence of Urdu on the Persian language. 
Ḥālī kā z̲ahnī irtiqā (Progress in the thinking of Hali). Ghulam Mustafa Khan was considered an authority on Maulana Altaf Hussain Hali
Pakistan's book of cricket records. In addition to the field of literature, his contributions as a statistician for the then Board of Control for Cricket in Pakistan, (now called Pakistan Cricket Board) during 1957-58 cricketing season is well appreciated by the fans of the game of cricket in Pakistan. He was later promoted and served as Board Secretary to PCB in 1995. He was meticulous about his work and wrote informative columns about Pakistan's cricket in Wisden Cricket Almamnac and the Cricketer International magazine on a regular basis. Due to his valued contributions to the game of cricket, the Pakistan Cricket Board management including the then Chairman Shaharyar Khan were deeply saddened at his death.

Death and legacy
Ghulam Mustafa Khan died on 25 September 2005 at age 93. Many literary organizations and two universities that he was personally associated with expressed sorrow over his death. Iftikhar Arif, then Chairman, Pakistan Academy of Letters said that his death would significantly affect the research work in the field of literature.

Vice-Chancellor of University of Karachi in 2005, Pirzada Qasim called his death a blow to Urdu literature in Pakistan.

Awards and recognition
Sitara-i-Imtiaz (Star of Excellence) by the President of Pakistan
Allama Iqbal Award for writing his book Iqbal and Quran

References

1912 births
2005 deaths
People from Jabalpur
Aligarh Muslim University alumni
Pakistani educational theorists
Pakistani scholars
Pakistani Sunni Muslim scholars of Islam
Pakistani Sufis
Urdu-language writers
Linguists of Urdu
Urdu critics
Recipients of Sitara-i-Imtiaz
Faculty of Law, Aligarh Muslim University alumni
Muhajir people
Rashtrasant Tukadoji Maharaj Nagpur University alumni
People from Hyderabad, Sindh
Pakistani lexicographers
Pakistani literary critics
Iqbal scholars
Sindhi people
Linguists from Pakistan
Academic staff of the University of Sindh
20th-century linguists
20th-century Pakistani philosophers
20th-century lexicographers